Averitt Express is a privately owned transportation and supply chain management company based in Cookeville, Tennessee. The company was founded as Livingston Merchant's Co-op in 1958 and incorporated as Averitt Express in 1969. Averitt is owned by Gary Sasser, who purchased the company from its original owner, Thurman Averitt, in October 1971 at the age of 20. At the time of Sasser's purchase, Averitt operated 3 trucks and 5 trailers. , the company claims to be "one of the nation's leading freight transportation and supply chain management providers".

Service area 
Averitt Express runs primarily in 18 states in the Southeast United States, including Florida, Georgia, South Carolina, North Carolina, Alabama, Mississippi, Virginia, Kentucky, Texas, Oklahoma, Arkansas, Tennessee, and Louisiana.  They also have single terminals in California, Ohio, Wisconsin, Missouri, and Illinois.

Transportation services 
Averitt Express provides the following services:

Climate controlled
Cross-border (Canada, Mexico, Puerto Rico/Virgin Islands)
Dedicated
Expedited/time critical
Intermodal
International (ocean/air, Asia-Memphis Express)
Less than truckload shipping (LTL) (regional, nationwide, distribution/consolidation)
Portside
Retail services (general retail, retail distribution)
Transportation management
Truckload (dry van, flatbed, truckload brokerage)
Air charter
Value-added services (national call center)
Warehousing
Supply chain
Integrated services

Charity work 
Averitt Cares for Kids is a non-profit organization that is funded by associates of Averitt Express and is managed by the company. associated with St. Jude's Children's Hospital.

Awards 
Averitt Express has won many quality awards for environmental responsibility, publication service, and safety, as well as many customer service awards from companies including Walmart, Dollar General, General Motors, Jack Daniels, etc.

References

Further reading 
  (Preview page).

External links 
Official website

Companies based in Tennessee
Economy of the Southeastern United States
Economy of the Southwestern United States
Trucking companies of the United States
Transportation companies based in Tennessee